Here I Am is a live album by Marvin Sapp as well as his fifth on Verity Records. The album debuted at number 2 on the Billboard 200 with first-week sales of 76,000 copies, making it the highest charting gospel album in history.

Track listing

Credits 
Note: Personnel is from iTunes digital booklet

Executive Producers 
Marvin Sapp

MaLinda Sapp

James "Jazzy" Jordan

Vocalists 
Myron Butler (director)

Caltomeesh West

Chelsea West

Aisha Cleaver

Jamil Freeman

Deonis Cook

Michael Bethany

Musicians 
Aaron Lindsey- Keyboards

Buddy Strong- Keyboards

Parris Bowens- Keyboards

Derrick Ray Sr.- Bass

Calvin Rodgers- Drums

Rick Watford- Guitars

Javier Solis- Percussion

Dan Duncan- Trumpet

Mike Martz- Trumpet

Joe Mason- Trombone

Mark Wells- Trombone

Bruce Vanderveen- Alto Sax and Horn Arrangement

Tommy Proulx- Tenor Sax

Strings by Nashville String Machine

Lloyd Barry- String Arrangement

Charts

Weekly charts

Year-end charts

Certifications

References

2010 albums
Marvin Sapp albums